Xenorhabdus vietnamensis  is a bacterium from the genus of Xenorhabdus which has been isolated from the nematode Steinernema sangi in Vietnam.

References

Further reading

External links
Type strain of Xenorhabdus vietnamensis at BacDive -  the Bacterial Diversity Metadatabase

Bacteria described in 2010